High-integrity software is software whose failure may cause serious damage with possible "life-threatening consequences." “Integrity is important as it demonstrates the safety, security, and maintainability of… code.” Examples of high-integrity software are nuclear reactor control, avionics software, and process control software.

A number of standards are applicable to high-integrity software, including:
 DO-178C, Software Considerations in Airborne Systems and Equipment Certification
 CENELEC EN 50128, Railway applications - Communication, signalling and processing systems - Software for railway control and protection systems
 IEC 61508, Functional Safety of Electrical/Electronic/Programmable Electronic Safety-related Systems (E/E/PE, or E/E/PES)

See also
 Safety-critical system
 High availability software
 Formal methods
 Software of unknown pedigree

References

External links
 
 
 

Software by type
Software quality
Safety engineering